Richard Andrew Robinson OBE (born 3 April 1964) is an English rugby union coach and retired player. He was the director of rugby at Bristol until November 2016. He is the former head coach of Scotland and England. From September 2019 to December 2022, he was the head coach of the Romania's national rugby team.

Robinson played as an openside flanker for Bath, England and the British & Irish Lions. He was head coach of England from October 2004 until November 2006, then coach of Edinburgh Rugby and joint coach of Scotland A between October 2007 and June 2009. On 4 June 2009 Robinson was named the new head coach of Scotland. He resigned on 25 November 2012 following a 21–15 defeat at home against Tonga.

Playing career

Born in Taunton, Somerset, Robinson made his England debut against Australia on 12 June 1988, and gained eight caps, playing his last match on 18 November 1995 against South Africa. Robinson was quite small for a back row forward, being only 5 ft 9in (1.75 m), and weighing 13 st 12 lb (88 kg). He played 6 non-international games for the British & Irish Lions on their 1989 tour of Australia.

Teaching
Whilst playing for Bath, Robinson taught mathematics, physical education and rugby at Writhlington School, King Edward's School, Bath and later Colston's Collegiate School in Bristol, where he and Alan Martinovic masterminded the school's Daily Mail Cup wins in 1995 and 1996. 'Robbo' then left to play rugby professionally with Bath.

Coaching
Robinson later coached Bath before being appointed forwards coach of England and was deputy to Clive Woodward with the World Cup-winning England side in 2003. When Woodward resigned from the role of England coach in September 2004, Robinson was named as acting coach before being confirmed in the position. He was also a coach on the Lions tours to Australia in 2001 and New Zealand in 2005.

Robinson won just nine of his twenty two matches in charge of England. In November 2006, it was confirmed that Robinson would remain head coach with the position reviewed after the two tests against South Africa. Defeat in the second test increased demands from supporters that he should be replaced. On 29 November his resignation as head coach was announced, with Robinson blaming his lack of support from the RFU.

International matches as head coach with England 
Note: World Rankings Column shows the World Ranking England was placed at on the following Monday after each of their matches

Record by country 

In the summer of 2007, the Scottish Rugby Union appointed Robinson the new head coach of Edinburgh Rugby, as well as joint coach of Scotland A with Glasgow coach Sean Lineen. In his first season as coach, he guided Edinburgh to the highest ever finish by a Scottish side at that time in the Celtic League (joint 3rd), despite numerous international players leaving the previous summer for more lucrative contracts in England and France. The following season (2008–09) Edinburgh leap-frogged Leinster and the Ospreys on the final day of the competition to finish runners-up behind Munster. Edinburgh also finished highest points scorers. He stepped down in June 2009 to take up the role of head coach of Scotland, replacing Frank Hadden. Although his time as Scotland coach included a 2–0 series win in Argentina and home wins over Australia and South Africa – the latter advancing Scotland to a record sixth place in the world rankings – his stint ended after a string of disappointing results, culminating in defeat by Tonga on 24 November 2012 which was followed a day later by his resignation.

International matches as head coach with Scotland

Record by country 

On 18 February 2013 it was announced by Bristol Rugby club that Andy Robinson was joining the club as the new director of rugby and in 2016 Bristol gained promotion to the Aviva Premiership under him.

Personal life
Robinson is a vegetarian.
He has four children; Olly Robinson who currently plays for the Cardiff Blues; Ed Robinson, who is assistant coach at Jersey Reds; Henry; and one daughter, Charlotte Robinson.

Career record

Record as England player: Games played 8, Won 4, Lost 3, Drawn 1; 1 try (vs France)

Record as England head coach: Games coached 22, Won 9, Lost 13, Drawn: 0
Biggest Win: Canada 70–0 (November 2004)
Biggest Loss (home or away): Australia 34–3 (June 2006)
Biggest Loss (home): New Zealand 20–41 (November 2006)

Record as Scotland head coach: Games coached 35, Won 15, Lost 19, Drawn 1

References

External links
Planet-rugby stats
Sporting Heroes

1964 births
Living people
Alumni of Loughborough University
Bath Rugby players
England international rugby union players
England national rugby union team coaches
English rugby union coaches
English rugby union players
British & Irish Lions rugby union players from England
Romania national rugby union team coaches
Loughborough Students RUFC players
Officers of the Order of the British Empire
Rugby union players from Taunton
Scotland national rugby union team coaches
Barbarian F.C. players
Rugby union flankers
English expatriate sportspeople in Romania